In North America, Old Stock refers lineage dating back to the colonial era:
Old Stock Americans
Old Stock Canadians